An open vowel is a vowel sound in which the tongue is positioned as far as possible from the roof of the mouth. Open vowels are sometimes also called low vowels (in U.S. terminology ) in reference to the low position of the tongue.

In the context of the phonology of any particular language, a low vowel can be any vowel that is more open than a mid vowel. That is, open-mid vowels, near-open vowels, and open vowels can all be considered low vowels.

Partial list
The open vowels with dedicated symbols in the International Phonetic Alphabet are:

 open front unrounded vowel 
 open front rounded vowel 
 open back unrounded vowel 
 open back rounded vowel 

There also are central vowels that do not have dedicated symbols in the IPA:
 open central rounded vowel 

There is no unambiguous way of transcribing the open central vowels (but see obsolete/nonstandard IPA ᴀ). The diaeresis indicates centralization, so  could mean near-front and  could mean near-back.

The extremely rare contrast between open front, central and back unrounded vowels has been reported to occur in the Hamont-Achel dialect of Limburgish, which features long versions of these sounds, as well as short versions of the open front and back vowels. The short versions do not contrast directly with the open central vowel, which can only be long.

See also
Close vowel

References

Bibliography

Vowels by height